The Port of Tornio (Finnish: Tornion satama, Swedish: Torneå hamn), also known as the Port of Röyttä, is a cargo port located in the city of Tornio, Finland, at the end of the Bothnian Bay and close to Finland's border with Sweden. It is near the Port of Kemi, with which it shares part of the shipping lane.

The port is operated by Outokumpu Shipping, and its main user is the adjacent Outokumpu steelworks.

The annual international cargo throughput of the Port of Tornio was  3.0 million tons in 2018, fairly evenly split between exports and imports, making it the tenth biggest port in Finland by tonnage.

References

Ports and harbours of Finland
Water transport in Finland
Tornio
Buildings and structures in Lapland (Finland)